Michael Fox, MBE (8 March 1934 – 9 May 2009) was a British-Israeli lawyer. He was co-founder of Herzog, Fox & Neeman, Israel's largest law firm.

Biography
Michael Fox was born in London, England, to Sam and Freda Fox. He studied law at the University of London (King's College London) and opened a private practice, Fox & Gibbons, in London, prior to his immigration to Israel in 1968. He lived in Herzliya Pituah. Fox was married to Sheila Israel, also an attorney. They had no children. He died in Jerusalem on 9 May 2009, after a decade-long battle with cancer.

Legal and journalistic career
Fox was a member of the International Bar Association and the Law Society of England and Wales. He was an expert in corporate law, especially in mergers & acquisitions and infrastructure development. He was chairman of the Israel, Britain and the Commonwealth Association (IBCA). Fox wrote a monthly column for the English edition of the Israeli newspaper Haaretz. A selection of his Haaretz columns was published as a book with an introduction by the English writer and his childhood friend John Gross.

Honours
In 2003, Fox was made a Member of the Order of the British Empire (MBE) for his contribution to Israel–British relations.

Published works
 Mountains and Molehills, Essays 2003–2007, Weill Publishers

References

External links
Herzog, Fox & Neeman
Michael Fox

Members of the Order of the British Empire
Alumni of King's College London
Deaths from cancer in Israel
English emigrants to Israel
English Jews
English solicitors
20th-century Israeli lawyers
Israeli people of English-Jewish descent
1934 births
2009 deaths
20th-century English lawyers